George Lee Johnson (born December 8, 1956) is a former professional basketball player.

A 6'7" forward/center from St. John's University and born in Brooklyn, New York, Johnson played in the National Basketball Association (NBA) from 1978 to 1985 as a member of the Milwaukee Bucks, Denver Nuggets, Indiana Pacers, Philadelphia 76ers, and Washington Bullets. He averaged 9.1 points per game and 5.6 rebounds per game in his NBA career.

Johnson was player-coach for the Long Island Surf of the United States Basketball League in 1992.

NBA career statistics

Regular season

|-
| align="left" | 1978–79
| align="left" | Milwaukee
| 67 || - || 17.3 || .482 || - || .718 || 5.4 || 1.2 || 1.1 || 0.7 || 6.2
|-
| align="left" | 1979–80
| align="left" | Denver
| 75 || - || 25.8 || .476 || .222 || .783 || 7.8 || 2.1 || 1.1 || 0.9 || 10.2
|-
| align="left" | 1980–81
| align="left" | Indiana
| 43 || - || 21.6 || .462 || .000 || .762 || 6.5 || 2.0 || 1.1 || 0.5 || 10.6
|-
| align="left" | 1981–82
| align="left" | Indiana
| 59 || 4 || 12.2 || .412 || .000 || .750 || 3.7 || 0.7 || 0.6 || 0.4 || 5.1
|-
| align="left" | 1982–83
| align="left" | Indiana
| 82 || 64 || 28.0 || .477 || .184 || .733 || 6.6 || 2.7 || 0.9 || 0.6 || 11.6
|-
| align="left" | 1983–84
| align="left" | Indiana
| 81 || 20 || 25.6 || .465 || .234 || .826 || 5.7 || 2.4 || 1.0 || 0.6 || 13.0
|-
| align="left" | 1984–85
| align="left" | Philadelphia
| 55 || 3 || 13.7 || .407 || .100 || .875 || 3.0 || 0.7 || 0.6 || 0.3 || 4.8
|-
| align="left" | 1985–86
| align="left" | Washington
| 2 || 0 || 3.5 || .333 || .000 || 1.000 || 1.0 || 0.0 || 0.0 || 0.0 || 2.0
|- class="sortbottom"
| style="text-align:center;" colspan="2"| Career
| 464 || 91 || 21.3 || .463 || .189 || .779 || 5.6 || 1.8 || 0.9 || 0.6 || 9.1
|}

Playoffs

|-
| align="left" | 1980–81
| align="left" | Indiana
| 2 || - || 11.5 || .625 || .000 || .000 || 2.0 || 0.5 || 0.0 || 0.0 || 5.0
|-
| align="left" | 1984–85
| align="left" | Philadelphia
| 5 || 0 || 4.8 || .625 || 1.000 || .000 || 1.4 || 0.0 || 0.0 || 0.0 || 2.2
|- class="sortbottom"
| style="text-align:center;" colspan="2"| Career
| 7 || 0 || 6.7 || .625 || 1.000 || .000 || 1.6 || 0.1 || 0.0 || 0.0 || 3.0
|}

References

External links
Career statistics

1956 births
Living people
African-American basketball players
American expatriate basketball people in Italy
American expatriate basketball people in Spain
American men's basketball players
Basketball players from New York City
CB Girona players
Centers (basketball)
Denver Nuggets players
Indiana Pacers players
Liga ACB players
Milwaukee Bucks draft picks
Milwaukee Bucks players
New Utrecht High School alumni
Philadelphia 76ers players
Power forwards (basketball)
Sportspeople from Brooklyn
St. John's Red Storm men's basketball players
Washington Bullets players
United States Basketball League coaches
21st-century African-American people
20th-century African-American sportspeople